John C. Reeves House is a historic home located near Wellsburg, Brooke County, West Virginia. It was built about 1870 and is a two-story, painted brick Italianate style farmhouse.  It sits on a foundation of smooth limestone blocks.  It features tall and narrow windows, with semi-circular lintels.

It was listed on the National Register of Historic Places in 2006.

References

Houses on the National Register of Historic Places in West Virginia
National Register of Historic Places in Brooke County, West Virginia
Italianate architecture in West Virginia
Houses completed in 1870
Houses in Brooke County, West Virginia